Tafuna Jets is an association football team from Pago Pago, American Samoa. They play in the territory's top division, the FFAS Senior League. In Footballmax, the club is called Jets A.

Squad
2022 Squad

References

Football clubs in American Samoa